Paroligolophus meadii is a species of harvestman. It occurs in England. It is less common and significantly smaller than the related species Paroligolophus agrestis.

References

Harvestmen
Fauna of the United Kingdom
Animals described in 1890